Desulfuromonas svalbardensis is a species of psychrophilic, Fe(III)-reducing bacteria. It is Gram-negative, rod-shaped and motile. Its type strain is 112T (=DSM 16958T =JCM 12927T) .

References

Further reading
Neilson, Alasdair H., and Ann-Sofie Allard. Organic Chemicals in the Environment: Mechanisms of Degradation and Transformation. CRC Press, 2012.

External links
 LPSN
Type strain of Desulfuromonas svalbardensis at BacDive -  the Bacterial Diversity Metadatabase

Desulfuromonadales
Bacteria described in 2006